Adranosite is a mineral discovered in the La Fossa crater, Vulcano, Aeolian Islands, Italy, with the formula (NH4)4NaAl2(SO4)4Cl(OH)2. Adranosite-(Fe) is the Fe3+ analogue of adranosite, with the formula (NH4)4NaFe2(SO4)4Cl(OH)2.

References 

minerals